Atlantic Air BVI (AABVI) was an airline based in the British Virgin Islands (BVI) in the Caribbean which started up in 1992 with one Short 330-200 (VP-LVR) commuter turboprop aircraft. AABVI ran a service between Tortola, BVI and San Juan, Puerto Rico, with five round trip flights a day operated seven days a week. On 6 May 1993 the Short aircraft experienced an aborted take off from Tortola and ran off the end of the runway into Trellis Bay.  There were no serious injuries.

The wrecked aircraft was then taken by barge around to the north side of the island to be used as a prop for a BBC film. The fuselage was then taken to the Great Dog area in the BVI and sunk as a part of the BVI's continual artificial reef program. The plane, without wings or tail, sits in the sand patch in about 50 feet of water.

References

Airlines of the British Virgin Islands